James Patrick Brady, better known as Jim Brady (March 11, 1908 – disappeared June 7, 1967), was a Canadian Métis political leader and activist in Saskatchewan and Alberta. Along with Malcolm Norris, he is generally regarded as one of the two most influential Métis leaders of his era. Brady was a self-educated Marxist, Socialist, and Métis nationalist, as well as a member of the Communist Party of Canada. Brady was a strong advocate and voice for the road allowance Métis of Alberta and would go on to become an instrumental part in the formalization of today's contemporary Métis Settlements in Alberta. Brady is a member of the historic Metis Settlements "Famous Five" leadership.

Biography
He was born on March 11, 1908, parented by a daughter of Métis Strathcona, Alberta pioneer Laurent Garneau and an Irish immigrant. Brady served in the Canadian Army in the European Theatre of World War II. He also helped to found numerous Métis political organizations in Western Canada. These included the Métis Association of Alberta, the Métis Association of Saskatchewan, and the Métis Association of La Ronge. He and Norris were motive force behind formation of Alberta's Metis settlements.

Disappearance
Jim Brady's disappearance is still the subject of mystery and controversy. He disappeared in northern Saskatchewan while on a prospecting trip with a Cree friend in June 1967. Their remains were never found, fueling speculation that they may have been murdered, or assassinated for his political activities.

See also
 List of people who disappeared
 Métis in Alberta
 Politics of Saskatchewan

References

Further reading

External links

University of Alberta biographical page on James P. Brady.

1908 births
1960s missing person cases
Canadian activists
Canadian Métis people
Canadian military personnel of World War II
Canadian socialists
Indigenous leaders in Alberta
Indigenous leaders in Saskatchewan
Métis politicians
Missing people
Missing person cases in Canada

Canadian communists
Members of the Communist Party of Canada
1960s in Saskatchewan